Harold Alfred "Hack" Simpson (June 26, 1910 – March 30, 1978) was a Canadian ice hockey player who competed in the 1932 Winter Olympics. He was born in Winnipeg. In 1932 he was a member of the Canadian ice hockey team, which won the gold medal. He played in five matches and scored six goals.

References

1910 births
1978 deaths
Canadian ice hockey forwards
Olympic ice hockey players of Canada
Ice hockey players at the 1932 Winter Olympics
Olympic gold medalists for Canada
Winnipeg Hockey Club players
Olympic medalists in ice hockey
Medalists at the 1932 Winter Olympics
Ice hockey people from Winnipeg